Ice skating is popular in North India in places like Ladakh, Kashmir and Shimla where cold weather occurs and it is possible to skate outdoors. Much of India has a tropical climate, hence in the rest of the country, ice skating is limited to the few artificial rinks available. An ice skating festival is organised in Shimla every year.

Indoor ice rinks in India
Indoor ice skating rinks are present in the following places:
 Doon Ice Skating Rink 60m x 30m Olympic size has a seating capacity of 3000. Located at Maharana Pratap Sports Complex, Raipur, Dehradun.
 Essel World, Mumbai (Near Borivali).
 iSKATE located on 6th floor of Ambience Mall, Gurugram.
 Neptune Magnet Mall, Lower Powai, L.B.S. Marg, Bhandup (W), Mumbai.
 Atria the millennium mall, Dr Annie Besant Rd, Worli,  Mumbai.
 Sparkys Ice Skating at Lulu international shopping mall, Edappally, Kochi.

Outdoor ice rinks in India
 Shimla Ice Skating Rink, Circular Road, Shimla, Himachal Pradesh.
 Gulmarg under Ministry of Tourism, Jammu and Kashmir Government.
 Leh, Ladakh UT.
 Kargil, Ladakh UT.

See also
 Bandy Federation of India
 Ice hockey in India
 :Category:Indian figure skaters

References

External links
 Ice Skating Association of India

 
Sport in India by sport
Adventure tourism in India